Andriy Vasylyovych Boryachuk (born 23 April 1996) is a Ukrainian professional footballer who plays as a forward for Shakhtar Donetsk.

Career

Shakhtar Donetsk
Boryachuk is a product of the Shakhtar Donetsk academy. During his debut season in the Ukrainian Premier League he managed to earn his first hat-trick in the game against FC Hoverla Uzhhorod. In 2015–16 season Boryachuk scored twice against a principal contender FC Dnipro Dnipropetrovsk earning a 2:0 victory for Shakhtar on 13 August 2015. While officially listed for the under 21 team with his efforts alone the "Miners" senior team were victorious in a number of other games against such clubs as Metalist, Karpaty, Olimpik, and others. By the winter recess of 2015–16 season, Boryachuk managed to earn another hat-trick and a poker (four goal game).

International

Ukraine
He made his debut for Ukraine national football team on 16 November 2018 in a 2018–19 UEFA Nations League B game against Slovakia, as a starter.

Honours

Club
Shakhtar
Ukrainian Premier League: 2016–17
Ukrainian Cup: 2015–16, 2016–17
Ukrainian Super Cup: 2017

Career statistics

Club

References

External links

Profile at FC Shakhtar Donetsk website

1996 births
Living people
Footballers from Vinnytsia
Ukrainian footballers
FC Shakhtar Donetsk players
FC Mariupol players
Ukrainian Premier League players
Süper Lig players
Association football forwards
Ukraine under-21 international footballers
Ukraine international footballers
Ukrainian expatriate footballers
Çaykur Rizespor footballers
Ukrainian expatriate sportspeople in Turkey
Expatriate footballers in Turkey
Mezőkövesdi SE footballers
Nemzeti Bajnokság I players
Expatriate footballers in Hungary
Ukrainian expatriate sportspeople in Hungary
FC Rukh Lviv players
Ukraine youth international footballers